Her Last Affaire is a 1935 British drama film directed by Michael Powell and starring Hugh Williams, Viola Keats, Cecil Parker and Googie Withers. The wife of a politician is found dead at a country inn. It was based on the play S.O.S. by Walter Ellis.

Cast
 Hugh Williams as Alan Heriot 
 Viola Keats as Lady Avril Weyre 
 Francis L. Sullivan as Sir Julian Weyre 
 Sophie Stewart as Jodie Weyre 
 Felix Aylmer as Lord Carnforth 
 Cecil Parker as Sir Arthur Harding 
 John Gardner as Boxall 
 Henry Caine as Inspector Marsh 
 Gerrard Tyrell as Martin 
 John Laurie as Robb 
 Googie Withers as Effie

External links

 Reviews and articles at the Powell & Pressburger Pages

1935 films
1930s English-language films
Films directed by Michael Powell
Films by Powell and Pressburger
British drama films
Quota quickies
British black-and-white films
1935 drama films
1930s British films